"The Hearts Filthy Lesson" (no apostrophe in "Hearts") is a song by David Bowie, from his 1995 album Outside, and issued as a single ahead of the album. It showcased Bowie's new, industrial-influenced sound. Lyrically, the single connects with the rest of the album, with Bowie offering a lament to "tyrannical futurist" Ramona A. Stone, a theme continued in subsequent songs. The song is also meant to confront Bowie's own perceptions about the ritual creation and degradation of art. It appears in the end credits of the 1995 film Seven.

Song development 
The song came out of the March 1994 Leon sessions in which Bowie and his band had performed long, improvised musical numbers, from which much of the album Outside was born. Due to the song coming out of band experimentation, the song is credited with 6 authors: Bowie, Brian Eno, Reeves Gabrels, Mike Garson, Erdal Kızılçay, and Sterling Campbell. Bowie would say that the song "doesn't have a straightforward coherent message to it. ... It's just information: make of it what you will", and that it is a "montage of subject matter, bits from newspapers, storylines, dreams and half-formed thoughts". At one point during the song's development, Bowie went back and recorded new lyrics based on English landscape painters. Reeves Gabrels, who worked with Bowie on the album, told him, "that's nice and all – but it's kind of destroyed the essence of the song, don't you think?", after which Bowie restored the original lyrics.

Reception and chart performance 
Critical reception to the song was generally tepid, though it would be re-evaluated by many critics when heard in the context of the album soon afterwards. In spite of its defiantly noncommercial sound the song reached No. 35 in the UK and No. 41 in Canada. Writing for Dotmusic, James Masterton said the song "wanders around apparently aimlessly for four minutes in a most unmemorable fashion." Pan-European magazine Music & Media commented, "Put Bowie & Eno in one room, and the same kind of magic occurs as when Jagger & Richards reunite. His last albums were "nice", but with this industrial track the thin white duke returns to the front." A reviewer from Music Week rated it three out of five, adding, "Slowpaced yed oddly stirring, an androgynous avan-ballad which provides proof positive of Bowie's regeneration." Biographer Nicholas Pegg said that to those uninitiated to Bowie's music, this song came off as "a tuneless din", but to those who know Bowie it was "a stunning slab of industrial techno-rock."

The single was Bowie's first to enter the top 100 in the US charts since "Never Let Me Down" in 1987 by briefly peaking there at No. 92. In Sweden, "The Hearts Filthy Lesson" peaked at No. 34 in 1995.

Music video 
The video featured a montage of art-style mutilations and gory objets d'art and was subsequently edited when shown on MTV. The clip was directed by Samuel Bayer, the man behind Nirvana's classic "Smells Like Teen Spirit" video. The video, which was controversial enough to require a re-edit for MTV, contained "shots of skulls, gibbets, candles and gruesome objects in pickling jars, while all the time a skeletal string-puppet drummer thrashes out the rhythm." Pegg described the results as "brilliant, frightening, and unlikely to woo the mass market." In interviews, Bowie commented on the "ritual art" aspects of Outside: "My input revolved around the idea of ritual art—what options were there open to that kind of quasi-sacrificial blood-obsessed sort of art form? And the idea of a neo-paganism developing—especially in America—with the advent of the new cults of tattooing and scarification and piercings and all that. I think people have a real need for some spiritual life and I think there's great spiritual starving going on. There's a hole that's been vacated by an authoritative religious body—the Judaeo-Christian ethic doesn't seem to embrace all the things that people actually need to have dealt with in that way—and it's sort of been left to popular culture to soak up the leftover bits like violence and sex.

Live versions 
Bowie first performed the song on the Late Show with David Letterman on 25 September 1995, the day before the album was released in the US. He performed the song during his 50th birthday celebration concert in New York City on 9 January 1997, and this performance was included on the "Earthling in the City" CD. A version recorded in July 1996 at the Phoenix Festival in Stratford-upon-Avon, Warwickshire, England was released on the live album LiveAndWell.com in 2000. It was regularly performed during Bowie's 1995–1996 Outside Tour; a version performed in 1995 during this tour was released in 2020 on Ouvre le Chien (Live Dallas 95). It was performed occasionally during Bowie's 1997 Earthling Tour, and the song was included in the track listing for his live album Look at the Moon! (Live Phoenix Festival 97) (2021).

Other releases 
The radio edit was included on the compilation albums Best of Bowie (2-CD US/Canada 2002) and Nothing Has Changed (3-CD 2014). Several of the remixes were released on the 2004 limited 2CD edition of Outside. The song plays over the closing credits of the 1995 movie Seven, although it was not released as part of the official soundtrack.

Versions 

Bowie Mix is credited as a Tony Maserati & Robert Holmes mix on many releases, but is identical to the album version

Track listing 
 All songs credited to Bowie/Eno/Gabrels/Kızılçay/Campbell. Except "Nothing to be Desired" credited to Bowie/Eno.

CD version 
 "The Hearts Filthy Lesson" (Radio Edit) – 3:32
 "I Am With Name" – 4:06
 "The Hearts Filthy Lesson" (Bowie Mix) – 4:56
 "The Hearts Filthy Lesson" (Trent Reznor Alternative Mix) – 5:19

US CD version 
 "The Hearts Filthy Lesson" (Album version) – 4:57
 "The Hearts Filthy Lesson" (Simenon Mix) – 5:01
 "The Hearts Filthy Lesson" (Trent Reznor Alternative Mix) – 5:19
 "Nothing to Be Desired"–2:15

US promo CD version 
 "The Hearts Filthy Lesson" (Radio Edit) – 3:32
 "The Hearts Filthy Lesson" (Simenon Mix) – 5:01
 "The Hearts Filthy Lesson" (Trent Reznor Alternative Mix) – 5:19
 "The Hearts Filthy Lesson" (Album version) – 4:57

UK 12" version 
 "The Hearts Filthy Lesson" (Trent Reznor Alternative Mix) – 5:19
 "The Hearts Filthy Lesson" (Bowie Mix) – 4:56
 "The Hearts Filthy Lesson" (Rubber Mix) – 7:41
 "The Hearts Filthy Lesson" (Simple Text Mix) – 6:38
 "The Hearts Filthy Lesson" (Filthy Mix) – 5:51

UK 12" 1 track promo version 
 "The Hearts Filthy Lesson" (Trent Reznor Alternative Mix) – 5:19

UK 12" 3 track promo version 
 "The Hearts Filthy Lesson" (Rubber Mix) – 7:41
 "The Hearts Filthy Lesson" (Simple Text Mix) – 6:38
 "The Hearts Filthy Lesson" (Filthy Mix) – 5:51

UK 12" picture disc version 
 "The Hearts Filthy Lesson" (Trent Reznor Alternative Mix) – 5:19
 "The Hearts Filthy Lesson" (Bowie Mix) – 4:57
 "The Hearts Filthy Lesson" (Rubber Mix) – 7:41
 "The Hearts Filthy Lesson" (Simple Text Mix) – 6:38
 "The Hearts Filthy Lesson" (Filthy Mix) – 5:51

US 12" promo version 
 "The Hearts Filthy Lesson" (Good Karma Mix) – 5:01
 "The Hearts Filthy Lesson" (Alternative Mix) – 5:19
 "The Hearts Filthy Lesson" (Bowie Mix) – 4:57
 "The Hearts Filthy Lesson" (Rubber Mix) – 7:41
 "The Hearts Filthy Lesson" (Filthy Mix) – 5:51

European Shaped CD version 
 "The Hearts Filthy Lesson" (Trent Reznor Alternative Mix) – 5:19
 "The Hearts Filthy Lesson" (Bowie Mix) – 4:56

Personnel 
 David Bowie – vocal, guitar, keyboards, saxophone, production
 Brian Eno – synthesizers, backing vocals, guitar treatments, production
 Reeves Gabrels – guitar (electric lead guitar)
 Erdal Kızılçay – bass
 Mike Garson – piano
 Sterling Campbell – drums
 Ruby Edwards – backing vocals
David Richards – production

Charts

References 

1995 singles
David Bowie songs
Songs written by David Bowie
Songs written by Brian Eno
Song recordings produced by Brian Eno
Music videos directed by Samuel Bayer
Song recordings produced by David Bowie
Songs written by Erdal Kızılçay
Songs written by Reeves Gabrels